Sobědruhy is an administrative part of the city of Teplice in the Czech Republic.

Geography

History

Traditionally, Sobědruhy was a town in Bohemia, whose Jewish community is probably one of the oldest in the province. The Jewish community of Sobědruhy includes parts of the Teplitz (Teplice), Dux (Duchcov), and Karbitz (Chabařovice) districts. The synagogue has a tower, with a clock, and two lamps respectively bearing the dates 1553 and 1654. For a time the Jewish cemetery at Sobědruhy was used as a burial-place by the Jewish community of Dresden. Many gravestones bear the inscription "Mi-Geresh Prag", marking the graves of Jews who were driven from Prague, some of whom died as martyrs. Until 1848 the Jews of Sobědruhy were confined to the ghetto - the Judengasse, as it is still called. For some time the Jewish community formed a part of the Leitmeritz district rabbinate, but in 1883 it gained independence and elected as its rabbi Ḥayyim (Heinrich) Galandauer (author of "Der Socialismus im Bibel und Talmud").

Sobědruhy had a Jewish population of 150 in 1900s.

Notable people
Dušan Třeštík
Bonnier family

References

Teplice
Populated places in Teplice District
Historic Jewish communities
Towns in the Ore Mountains